Liu Zheng (January 1929 – June 6, 2006) was a People's Republic of China politician. He was born in Changsha, Hunan. He was a delegate to the 5th National People's Congress and 6th National People's Congress.

References

1929 births
2006 deaths
People's Republic of China politicians from Hunan
Chinese Communist Party politicians from Hunan
Governors of Hunan
Delegates to the 5th National People's Congress
Delegates to the 6th National People's Congress
Members of the 7th Chinese People's Political Consultative Conference
Members of the 8th Chinese People's Political Consultative Conference
Members of the 9th Chinese People's Political Consultative Conference
Politicians from Changsha